Prince Kirill Alexandrovich Romanovsky-Iskander, or Cyril Iskander Romanov (5 December 1914 – 1992), or simply Prince Iskander, was one of the last two members of the House of Romanov to remain alive in Russia following the Revolution. 

He was the son of Prince Romanovsky-Iskander (15 November 1887 N.S. – 26 January 1957), né , and his first wife, Olga Iosifovna Rogowska. He was a grandson of Grand Duke Nicholas Constantinovich, the disgraced grandson of Tsar Nicholas I; thus, Kirill was a patrilineal great-great-grandson of Nicholas I.

Grand Duke Constantine Nicholaevich's son, Grand Duke Nicholas Constantinovich, was exiled to Central Asia in disgrace for stealing his mother's diamonds. Grand Duke Nicholas established a palace in Tashkent and lived in grand style where he sired a son, whom Tsar Alexander III (his great-uncle) granted the title Prince Iskander (Iskander was the Arabic form of Alexander). This prince, in turn, fathered the Prince Iskander.

He was born in Tashkent, a member of the Constantinovichi branch of the Russian Imperial Family. He had a sister, Princess Natalia Romanovskaya-Iskander (1917 - 1999). Their parents, who had been married since 1912, separated and in 1924 Kirill and his sister moved with their mother to Moscow (first moved to Plyushchikha Street, later to Arbat), where Olga remarried to Nicholas Androsov.

Kirill's stepfather adopted him and his sister so Prince Iskander was renamed Kirill Nikolaievich Androsov. His father remarried also, to Natalia Hanykova (30 December 1893 – 20 April 1982) in 1930 in Paris.

After the Russian Revolution, Kirill and his sister Natalia were the only two Romanov descendants in the male line in the USSR; the rest either left or were killed. They lived their entire lives in the USSR. Upon Kirill's death, the male line of the Constantinovich branch of the Romanov family died out. His second cousin is Prince Michael of Greece and Denmark and of Prince Philip, Duke of Edinburgh.

Ancestry

References

 
 
 thePeerage.com
 
 C. Arnold McNaughton, The Book of Kings: A Royal Genealogy, in 3 volumes (London, U.K.: Garnstone Press, 1973) , 

1914 births
1992 deaths
People from Tashkent
People from Syr-Darya Oblast
Morganatic issue of Romanovs